Lorraine Fernandes (born 24 December 1954) is an Indian field hockey player. She competed in the women's tournament at the 1980 Summer Olympics. During the Olympics she was one of the star members of India's hockey team which also included the Saini sisters and Prem Maya Sonir where they defeated Austria and Poland. They came fourth missing out on a bronze medal.

References

External links
 

1954 births
Living people
Indian female field hockey players
Olympic field hockey players of India
Field hockey players at the 1980 Summer Olympics
Place of birth missing (living people)